Roșia is a large commune in Romania, Crișana, Bihor County, around  north from the town of Beiuș. It is composed of two villages, Lazuri (Lázurihegy) and Roșia.

Geography
It is located in the eastern part of the county, at the edge of the Apuseni Mountains, in the foothills of the Pădurea Craiului Mountains. It lies on the banks of the Valea Roșie River, a tributary of the Crișul Negru; the Șoimuș River flows into the Valea Roșie near Roșia.

Roșia has beautiful landscapes, mountain rivers, caves, and large forests. In the Ciurul Mare Cave, speleologists have discovered some distinctively male, female, and child footprints; an anthropological analysis has identified Cro-Magnon and even Neanderthal characteristics in these footprints.

Population
According to the 2011 census, the commune has 2,384 inhabitants, 98.87% of whom are ethnic Romanians; 85.3% are Romanian Orthodox and 13.6% Pentecostal.

Natives
Gheorghe Ciuhandu (1875–1947), priest of the Romanian Orthodox Church, theologian, and historian

References

Communes in Bihor County
Localities in Crișana